D400 is a state road connecting D66 and D21 state roads to Pula city centre and Pula ferry port. Urban planning documents of the city of Pula, indicate that the road may be expanded from its current two traffic lanes to four.

The road, as well as all other state roads in Croatia, is managed and maintained by Hrvatske ceste, state owned company.

No car ferries operate from Pula ferry port.

Traffic volume 

There are no official published data on volume of traffic carried by the D400 road, however, the volume may be inferred from traffic volumes on the southernmost traffic counting sites of the state roads terminating at the D400 route, namely D21 and D66. Additionally the road carries an unspecified volume of urban traffic of the city of Pula, therefore it may be safely concluded that average annual daily traffic (AADT) and average summer daily traffic (ASDT) of the D400 road exceed 15,000 and 20,000 vehicles per day respectively.

Road junctions and populated areas

Sources

State roads in Croatia
Transport in Istria County